Russell E. Mikeska (born September 10, 1955) is a former American football tight end in the National Football League who played for the Atlanta Falcons. He played college football for the Texas A&M Aggies.

References

1955 births
Living people
American football tight ends
Atlanta Falcons players
Texas A&M Aggies football players
People from Temple, Texas
Players of American football from Texas